Peery may refer to:

George C. Peery (1873–1952), American Democratic politician, Governor of Virginia from 1934 to 1938
Janet Peery (born 1948), American short story writer and novelist from Wichita, Kansas
Nelson Peery (1923–2015), American political activist and author
Richard Peery (born 1938/39), American billionaire real estate developer
William Peery (1743–1800), American farmer, lawyer, and politician from Cool Spring, near Milton, in Sussex County

See also
Barnes-Peery House, known commonly as the Barnes Mansion, one of the oldest private homes of Jefferson County, Colorado
Peery's Egyptian Theater, movie palace located at 2439 Washington Blvd